Dianella Secondary College (formerly Mirrabooka Senior High School) is a public co-educational high day school, located in Dianella in the northern suburbs of Perth, Western Australia. It teaches years 7 to 12 in the Australian education system, and has around 600 students.

Mirrabooka Senior High School opened in 1965. In 2017 it changed its name to Dianella Secondary College.

The school also has a Education Support Centre for those with disabilities and other children that needs support.

Notable alumni 
 Dean Smith, Senator

See also

 List of schools in the Perth metropolitan area

References

External links 
 School website
 Australian War Memorial – Wreathlaying Photo Gallery – Mirrabooka Senior High School
 Government of Western Australia, Department of Education and Training – School Information - Mirrabooka Senior High School

Public high schools in Perth, Western Australia
Educational institutions established in 1965
1965 establishments in Australia